Varces-Allières-et-Risset is a commune in the Isère department in southeastern France. It is part of the Grenoble urban unit (agglomeration). It was created in 1955 by the merger of the former communes Varces and Allières-et-Risset.

Population
The population data given in the table below for 1954 and earlier refer to the former commune of Varces.

See also
Parc naturel régional du Vercors

References

Communes of Isère
Isère communes articles needing translation from French Wikipedia